Ausonia is the ancient Greek name for lower Italy, extended poetically to all Italy.

Ausonia may also refer to:

Places

Argentina
 Ausonia, Argentina, a community in General San Martín Department, Córdoba

Italy
 Ausonia, Lazio, a comune in the Province of Frosinone
 Ausona (ancient city), the ancient capital of the Ausones

Mars
 Ausonia Mensa, a geographical feature on the planet Mars
 Ausonia Montes, a mountain on Mars

Ships
 German aircraft carrier I (1915), a German aircraft carrier
 RMS Ausonia, a 1921 British ocean liner
 SS Ausonia (1956), an Italian cruise ship
 MS Cruise Ausonia, a 2002 fast Ro-Pax jumbo ferry

Sports 
 U.S. Ausonia Spezia, an Italian football (soccer) team
 , football club

Organizations 
 Arbora & Ausonia, a Portuguese/Spanish company specialized in hygiene products
 Lega Sud Ausonia, an Italian political party

Other uses
 Ausonia family, asteroids
 63 Ausonia, an asteroid

See also
 Ausones
 Aurunci
 Ausonium
 Ausonius (310–395)